Argyll and Bute may refer to: 

 Argyll and Bute, one of the 32 unitary council regions in Scotland, and a Lieutenancy Area
 Argyll and Bute (UK Parliament constituency), a constituency represented in the House of Commons of the Parliament of the United Kingdom
 Argyll and Bute (Scottish Parliament constituency), a constituency represented in the Scottish Parliament